Come Play with Me may refer to:

 Come Play with Me (1968 film), an Italian drama film
 Come Play with Me (1977 film), a British soft porn film 
 Come Play with Me (2021 film), a Mexican supernatural horror film
 Come Play with Me (album), a 1995 album by jazz saxophonist Charles McPherson

See also
 Play with Me (disambiguation)